Ronny and Ragge (Ronny och Ragge in Swedish) are two fictitious raggare characters played by Peter Settman and Fredde Granberg, popularized in the 1990s. They first appeared in sketches on Swedish television and then got their own series called Byhåla on Sveriges Television.

References

Comedy television characters
Fictional Swedish people